Zagradci may refer to:

 Zagradci, Bosnia and Herzegovina, a village near Gacko
 Zagradci, Croatia, a village near Netretić